Ski seat (Pležuh) derives from the fringes of Kobansko in the Drava valley. More than 200 years ago it was the only transportation which was used for fun, to drive down into the valley and other tasks.

The first ski seats were made of curved boards from unused barrels to which were attached two pillars connected with a board which served as the seat. Later, ski seat got a more modern image, as they were adapted to higher speeds, and used old skis. [1]

In 2011 a championship "4 cross" was organized in Maribor with 124 competitors. [2]

References
[1] http://www.plezuh.net/predstavitev.htm

[2] http://www.dostop.si/Novica.aspx?ID=1177

http://www.sit2ski.com/en/how-to-ride1.html

Sliding vehicles